Ljunggren is a Swedish surname. Notable people with the surname include:

Anna Elisabeth Ljunggren, née Storm-Mathisen (1943–2010), Norwegian physiotherapist
Anna Ljunggren (born 1984), Norwegian politician for the Labour Party
Bobby Ljunggren (born 1961), Swedish songwriter
Gustaf Ljunggren (academician) (1823–1905), Swedish man of letters, born at Lund, the son of a clergyman
Gustaf Ljunggren (1893–1984), Swedish athlete
Gustaf Ljunggren (1894–1966), Swedish chemist
John Ljunggren (1919–2000), Swedish athlete who competed mainly in the 50 kilometer walk
Michael Ljunggren (1962–1995), Swedish mobster and President of the Bandidos Motorcycle Club's Swedish chapters
Sten Ljunggren (born 1938), Swedish character actor
Wilhelm Ljunggren (1905–1973), Norwegian mathematician, specializing in number theory

See also
Ljungan
Lugeon

Swedish-language surnames